Eskdale is a civil parish in the Borough of Copeland, Cumbria, England.  It contains 29 listed buildings that are recorded in the National Heritage List for England.  Of these, one is listed at Grade II*, the middle of the three grades, and the others are at Grade II, the lowest grade.  The parish is in the Lake District National Park; it contains the villages of Eskdale Green and Boot, and the surrounding countryside, moorland and mountains.  In the parish is Long Rigg Farm, a model farm; the farmhouse, many of the farm buildings, and surrounding structures are listed.  Most of the other listed buildings are houses and associated structures, farmhouses, and farm buildings. In addition the listed buildings include a church, a corn mill, two bridges, and a telephone kiosk.


Key

Buildings

References

Citations

Sources

Lists of listed buildings in Cumbria